Lamproclasiopa is a genus of shore flies in the family Ephydridae.

Species
Lamproclasiopa aliceae Costa, Mathis & Marinoni, 2016
Lamproclasiopa aracataca (Cresson, 1940)
Lamproclasiopa argentipicta Costa, Mathis & Marinoni, 2016
Lamproclasiopa auritunica Costa, Mathis & Marinoni, 2016
Lamproclasiopa balsamae (Cresson, 1930)
Lamproclasiopa bisetulosa (Cresson, 1939)
Lamproclasiopa brunnea Costa, Mathis & Marinoni, 2016
Lamproclasiopa brunneonitens (Cresson, 1940)
Lamproclasiopa caligosa Costa, Mathis & Marinoni, 2016
Lamproclasiopa curva Costa, Mathis & Marinoni, 2016
Lamproclasiopa ecuadoriensis Costa, Mathis & Marinoni, 2016
Lamproclasiopa fumipennis (Wirth, 1955)
Lamproclasiopa furvitibia Costa, Mathis & Marinoni, 2016
Lamproclasiopa hendeli Wirth, 1968
Lamproclasiopa laevior (Cresson, 1934)
Lamproclasiopa lapaz Costa, Mathis & Marinoni, 2016
Lamproclasiopa mancha Costa, Mathis & Marinoni, 2016
Lamproclasiopa nadineae (Cresson, 1925)
Lamproclasiopa nitida (Cresson, 1918)
Lamproclasiopa painteri (Cresson, 1930)
Lamproclasiopa polita (Edwards, 1933)
Lamproclasiopa puella (Cresson, 1931)
Lamproclasiopa triangularis Costa, Mathis & Marinoni, 2016
Lamproclasiopa turgidula (Cresson, 1940)
Lamproclasiopa univittata (Cresson, 1946)
Lamproclasiopa xanthocera Costa, Mathis & Marinoni, 2016
Lamproclasiopa zerafael Costa, Mathis & Marinoni, 2016

References

Ephydridae
Diptera of North America
Diptera of South America
Brachycera genera
Taxa named by Friedrich Georg Hendel